Potenza (also , ; , Potentino dialect: Putenz) is a comune in the Southern Italian region of Basilicata (former Lucania).

Capital of the Province of Potenza and the Basilicata region, the city is the highest regional capital and one of the highest provincial capitals in Italy, overlooking the valley of the Basento river in the Apennine Mountains of Lucania, east of Salerno. Its territory is bounded by the comuni of Anzi, Avigliano, Brindisi Montagna, Picerno, Pietragalla, Pignola, Ruoti, Tito and Vaglio Basilicata.

History of Potenza

Ancient times 
The Lucanians of Potentia sided against Rome's enemies during the latter's wars against the Samnites and the Bruttii. Subjugated during the 4th century BC (later gaining the status of municipium), the Potentini rebelled after the Roman defeat at Cannae in 216 BC. 

However, the Battle of the Metaurus marked the end of any Carthaginian aspirations in Italy and Potentia was reconquered by the Romans and reduced to the status of military colony.

Middle Ages 
In the 6th century, the city passed to the Lombard Duchy of Benevento. Incursions by Saracen raiders menaced the city until the Norman conquest of  southern Italy secured the area. In the 12th century, Potenza became an episcopal see. In 1137, the city hosted Pope Innocent II and Emperor Lothair II during their failed attempt to conquer the Norman kingdom. In 1148 or 1149 in Potenza, Roger II of Sicily hosted King Louis VII of France, whom the Norman fleet had freed from the Saracens. After pillaging by Emperor Frederick II, the city remained loyal to the Hohenstaufen: as a result, it was almost totally destroyed by Charles I when the Angevin lord conquered the Kingdom of Sicily. On 18 December 1273, an earthquake further devastated the city.

Modern age 
In the following years of the Late Middle Ages, the city was owned by various feudal families before the Spanish domination, during which Potenza was the site of riots against the Spaniards. In 1694, it was almost completely destroyed by another earthquake.

With the declaration of the Neapolitan Republic in 1799, Potenza was one of the first cities to rebel against the king. After temporary Bourbon repression, the city was conquered by the French army in 1806 and declared the capital of Basilicata. King Joachim Murat improved the city's living conditions and administration, while some urban improvements were also introduced for the visit of Ferdinand II in 1846. 

A revolt broke out in 1848 and was again put down by Bourbon forces, until a third devastating earthquake followed in 1857. Potenza rebelled for the last time in 1860, before Garibaldi's revolutionary army brought about the unification of Italy.

In September 1943, the city suffered heavy Allied bombing. In 1980, another strong earthquake struck Potenza.

Main sights 

 Potenza Cathedral: The Duomo di San Gerardo, renovated in the 18th century. The cathedral still houses the rose window and the apse from the original 12th-century structure.
 San Francesco: church founded in 1274. The portal and the bell tower date from the 15th century. The church houses the De Grasis sepulchre and a Madonna in Byzantine style (13th century).
 The Torre Guevara, the last remnant of the old castle. It is now used to stage art exhibitions.
 The Palazzo Loffredo, a 17th-century noble residence. It now houses the National Archaeological Museum of Basilicata, dedicated to archaeologist Dinu Adameșteanu.
 Three gates of the old city walls, now demolished. The gates are the Porta San Giovanni, the Porta San Luca and the Porta San Gerardo.
 San Michele: 11th-12th century Romanesque-style church.
 Santa Maria del Sepolcro: church.
 The ruins of a Roman villa in the Poggio Tre Galli quarter.
 Musmeci Bridge, a unique construction, monument of modern civil engineering.

Geography

Climate 
Potenza experiences an oceanic climate (Cfb in the Köppen climate classification), failing narrowly to classify as warm-summer Mediterranean climate (Csb) because the month with the most precipitation has slightly less than three times as much as the driest month.

Population 
Potenza has a population of 67,122 as of 2015. It is the largest city in Basilicata.

Source:

Transportation

Road
Potenza is located at the eastern end of the RA5 motorway, a  branch from the A2 motorway.

Rail
Potenza is a rail junction on the main line from Salerno to Taranto, managed by FS Trenitalia. It has also a connection to Altamura and its own small metropolitan railway service, served by the Ferrovie Appulo Lucane regional company.  The city's main station, which was originally named Potenza Inferiore, is now known as Potenza Centrale. 

The nearest airports are:
 Salerno-Pontecagnano QSR 
 Foggia-Gino Lisa FOG 
 Bari-Palese BRI

Escalators
With the city centre situated at the top of a steep hill, escalators provide a form of public transport in Potenza. Potenza's public escalator network is the largest in Europe and the second largest in the world after Tokyo.

People 
 Saint Gerard of Potenza (died 1118) – bishop
 Giovanni Andrea Serrao (1731-1799) – intellectual and churchman
 Ascanio Branca (1840-1903) - politician  
 Domenico Montesano (1863-1930) - mathematician
 Tanio Boccia (1912–1982) – film director
 Emilio Colombo  (11 April 1920 – 24 June 2013) – politician
 Salvatore Dierna (1934-2016), architect
 Ruggero Deodato (1939) – film director
 Wally Buono (1950) – (CFL) football head coach (Calgary Stampeders, BC Lions) 
 Luciana Lamorgese (1953) – politician
 Cecilia D'Elia (1963) – politician
 Donato Sabia (1963-2020) – former middle distance runner
 Francesco Colonnese (1971) – former football player
 Giovanni Frezza (1972) – film actor
 Danilo Restivo (1972) – double murderer
 Vito Postiglione (1977) – racing driver
 Roberto Speranza  (1979) – politician
 William Cutolo (1949 - 1999), also known as "Billy Fingers" and "Wild Bill", powerful labor racketeer and underboss for the Colombo Crime Family

International relations 

Potenza is twinned with:
  Denver, United States
  Focșani, Romania
  Osuna, Spain
  Amatrice, Italy
  Tunja, Colombia

References

External links 

 Official website (in Italian)
 Battle of Potenza at canadiansoldiers.com
 Music State Conservatory "Carlo Gesualdo da Venosa"

 
Cities and towns in Basilicata